The Norway national alpine ski team represents Norway in International alpine skiing competitions such as Winter Olympic Games, FIS Alpine Ski World Cup and FIS Alpine World Ski Championships.

World Cup
Norwegian alpine skiers won six overall FIS Alpine Ski World Cup with men and none with women.

Men titles

See also
Norway at the Olympics
Norwegian Ski Federation

References

External links
Norges Skiforbund

Alpine ski
Norway
Alpine skiing organizations